Conical drums are a class of membranophone, or drum, that is characterized by sloping sides. They are usually one-headed. An example is the timbal.
The conical drum also has strings on the side to keep the object together.

References

Directly struck membranophones